The 1937 Kansas Jayhawks football team represented the University of Kansas in the Big Six Conference during the 1937 college football season. In their sixth season under head coach Adrian Lindsey, the Jayhawks compiled a 3–4–2 record (2–1–2 against conference opponents), finished in third place in the conference, and were outscored by opponents by a combined total of 74 to 72. They played their home games at Memorial Stadium in Lawrence, Kansas.

The team's statistical leaders included Clarence Douglass with 376 rushing yards and 27 points scored (four touchdowns and three extra points), Lyman Diven with 207 passing yards, Max Replogle with 180 receiving yards. George Stapleton was the team captain.

Schedule

References

Kansas
Kansas Jayhawks football seasons
Kansas Jayhawks football